Peninsula Mile Houses began to emerge  in 1849 with the construction of a stagecoach line connecting San Francisco and San Jose, California. They served as rest areas for travelers embarking on the rough journey that spanned at least nine hours.

History

The need for a stagecoach line between San Francisco and San Jose was spurred by rapid growth in the San Francisco Bay Area during the California Gold Rush. Peninsula mile houses were built along the route and named according to how many miles they sat from either the San Francisco Ferry Building or Mission San Francisco de Asís. Many of these simple rest stops for travelers and their horses evolved into thriving businesses, including hotels, restaurants, and saloons.

List of Peninsula Mile Houses

1 Mile House, or Abbey House, was located in Daly City, California.

3 Mile House was located near what is now the Interstate 280 (California)/Bayshore Freeway.

4 Mile House was located about a mile north of the 5 Mile House.

5 Mile House is located in San Francisco at 3600 San Bruno Avenue (Between Girard Street and Wilde Avenue), but no longer has any ground-floor business operating. In its heyday, it was a prominent stop because it was the last Mile House in San Francisco city limits, and because it was at the end of the Third Street rail line, which was built in 1894.

6 Mile House was the first Mile House outside of the San Francisco City limits.

7 Mile House was built in 1858 in Brisbane, California and is the only active mile house standing in its original location. In its early days, 7 Mile House was known to be a hub for gangsters, including members of the notorious Hayes Valley Gang, and eventually evolved into a brothel. It was a speakeasy during Prohibition in the United States in the 1920s, and by the 1980s, it had become an illegal “gambling den." In spite of its seedy past, 7 Mile House is one of the oldest bars in the San Francisco Bay Area, a live music venue, and a family/dog-friendly restaurant serving American, Italian, and Filipino food. Vanessa Garcia is the current owner.

12 Mile House was located in South San Francisco, California.

14 Mile House (nicknamed Uncle Tom's Cabin) was built in 1849 in San Bruno, California. The creek it was located by marked one of the most hazardous legs of the trip 

16 Mile House was built in Millbrae, California in 1872 and remained active in its original location until the early 1970s. It was reopened in a new location and currently operates as a steakhouse.

17 Mile House was also built in Millbrae, was first known to exist in 1844, became the first stop for Millbrae on the San Francisco and San Jose Railroad in 1863, and burned down in 1907.

References

Buildings and structures in California
Transportation in the San Francisco Bay Area
History of the San Francisco Bay Area